This page lists Japan-related articles with romanized titles beginning with the letter F. For names of people, please list by surname (i.e., "Tarō Yamada" should be listed under "Y", not "T"). Please also ignore particles (e.g. "a", "an", "the") when listing articles (i.e., "A City with No People" should be listed under "City").

F
F&C
F-Zero

Fa
Famicom Disk System
Fancy Lala
Fanservice
Fat Man
Fatal Fury

Fc
FCI

Fe
February 26 Incident
Feel My Heart
Feudalism

Fi
Fifth generation computer
Fighter (Dungeons & Dragons)
Final Fantasy (series)
Final Fantasy (video game)
Final Fantasy II
Final Fantasy III
Final Fantasy III (Nintendo DS)
Final Fantasy IV
Final Fantasy V
Final Fantasy VI
Final Fantasy VII
Final Fantasy VIII
List of Final Fantasy VII terms
Final Fantasy IX
Final Fantasy X
Final Fantasy X-2
Final Fantasy XI
Final Fantasy Anthology
Final Fantasy Chronicles
Final Fantasy Crystal Chronicles (series)
Final Fantasy Legend
Final Fantasy Origins
Final Fantasy Tactics
Final Fantasy Tactics Advance
Final Fantasy: The Spirits Within
Final Fight
Final Lap
Fire balloon
Fire Emblem
First Kurushima-Kaikyo Bridge
Fist of the North Star
Five kings of Wa

Fl
Flag of Japan
FLCL

Fo
Foreign relations of Japan
Foreign-born Japanese
Tsuguharu Foujita
Four Heavenly Kings
Four Hitokiri of the Bakumatsu
Four-character idiom

Fr
Freeters
Freeza
Front Mission
Fruits Basket

Fu
Mitsuo Fuchida
Hakuyō Fuchikami
Fuchū, Hiroshima (city)
Fuchū, Hiroshima (Aki)
Fuchū, Tokyo
Fuefuki, Yamanashi
Kinji Fukasaku
Fuji
Fuji Bank
Fuji District, Shizuoka
Fuji Heavy Industries, Ltd.
Fuji Rock Festival
Fuji Television
Fuji-Hakone-Izu National Park
Fuji, Saga
Fuji, Shizuoka
Fujieda, Shizuoka
Fujifilm
Fujihashi, Gifu
Fujii Sadakazu
Fujiidera, Osaka
Fujikawa, Shizuoka
Fujiko Fujio
Fujimi, Saitama
Alberto Fujimori
Fujimoto Kazuko
Shinichi Fujimura
Fujinomiya, Shizuoka
Masayuki Fujio
Fujioka
Fujioka, Aichi
Fujioka, Gunma
Fujioka, Tochigi
Kōsuke Fujishima
Fujisawa, Kanagawa
Tohru Fujisawa
Fujita Airlines
Tokiyasu Fujita
Fujitsu
Fujitsu District, Saga
Fujiwara family
Fujiwara no Michinaga
Fujiwara no Mototsune
Fujiwara no Yoshifusa
Fujiyoshida, Yamanashi
Kyoko Fukada
Fukagawa, Hokkaidō
Fukaya, Saitama
Fukayasu District, Hiroshima
Fukiage, Kagoshima
Fukube, Tottori
Fukuchiyama, Kyoto
Fukuda Eiko
Takeo Fukuda
Fukude, Shizuoka
Fukudomi, Saga
Fukue, Nagasaki
Fukue, Yamaguchi
Fukui Prefecture
Fukui, Fukui
Toshihiko Fukui
Fukuma, Fukuoka
Fukuoka, Fukuoka
Fukuoka, Gifu
Fukuoka Airport
Fukuoka Daiei Hawks
Fukuoka Prefecture
Masanobu Fukuoka
Fukuroi, Shizuoka
Fukusaki, Hyogo
Fukushima Prefecture
Fukushima, Fukushima
Fukushima, Hokkaidō
Mizuho Fukushima
Fukushima Prefecture
Fukushima Yasumasa
Fukutomi, Hiroshima
Fukuyama, Hiroshima
Fukuyama, Kagoshima
Fukuyama congenital muscular dystrophy
Masaharu Fukuyama
Yoshiki Fukuyama
Fukuzawa Yukichi
Full contact karate
Fullmetal Alchemist
Full Metal Panic!
Funabashi, Chiba
Funai District, Kyoto
Funakoshi Gichin
Funao, Okayama
Funaoka, Tottori
Funo, Hiroshima
Furano, Hokkaidō
Furanui
Furigana
Yasuo Furuhata
Furukawa, Miyagi
Fuse, Shimane
Fushigi Yūgi
Fussa, Tokyo
Futaba Channel
Futabatei Shimei
Futami District, Hiroshima
Futami, Ehime
Futami, Mie
Futanari
Futon
Futtsu, Chiba
Fuwa District, Gifu

F